Gottfried Wilhelm Leibniz University Hannover, also known as the University of Hannover, is a public research university located in Hanover, Germany. Founded on 2 May 1831 as Higher Vocational School, the university has undergone six periods of renaming, its most recent in 2006.

Leibniz University Hannover is a member of TU9, an association of the nine leading Institutes of Technology in Germany. It is also a member of the Conference of European Schools for Advanced Engineering Education and Research, a non-profit association of leading engineering universities in Europe. The university sponsors the German National Library of Science and Technology, the largest science and technology library in the world.

History 

The roots of the university begin in the Higher Vocational College/Polytechnic Institute, founded on 2 May 1831. In 1879 the Higher Vocational School moved into the historic Guelph Palace, which was specially converted for the purpose. 

On 1 April 1879, the Higher Vocational School became the Royal College of Technology. In 1899 Kaiser Wilhelm II granted the College of Technology a status equal to that of universities and the right to confer doctorates. The college was reconstructed in 1921 with the financial support of the College Patrons' Association. As of 1 July 1922, there were three faculties: Mathematics and Natural Sciences, Civil Engineering, and Mechanical Engineering.

Student numbers exceeded 30,000 for the first time in 1991. 

While 64 students first attended the Vocational School, today the university has around 25.700 students, more than 2.900 academics and scientists, and 160 departments and institutes.

Namesake 

The Senate of the university voted in April 2006 to rename the University of Hannover to "Leibniz Universität Hannover". Following agreement by the Leibniz Academy on the use of the name, the "Gottfried Wilhelm Leibniz Universität Hannover" received its name on the 360th anniversary of Gottfried Wilhelm Leibniz's birth. The brand of the university is "Leibniz Universität Hannover".

The old logo of the university was inspired by the Massachusetts Institute of Technology. The current logo, adopted in 2008, is a stylised excerpt from a letter to Duke Rudolf August of Wolfenbüttel, in which Leibniz presented binary numbers for the first time.

Faculties and staff 
Nine faculties with more than 190 first-degree full-time and part-time degree courses make the university the second-largest institution of higher education in Lower Saxony. The university staff comprises 2930 research and teaching staff, of whom 321 are professors. It has 1810 additional employees in administrative functions, 90 apprentices and some 1400 staff funded by third parties.

 Faculty of Architecture and Landscape Sciences
 Faculty of Civil Engineering and Geodetic Science
 Faculty of Economics and Management
 Faculty of Electrical Engineering and Computer Science
 Faculty of Humanities
 Faculty of Law
 Faculty of Mathematics and Physics
 Faculty of Mechanical Engineering
 Faculty of Natural Sciences
 QUEST Leibniz Research School
 Leibniz School of Education

Facilities 

The campus of the university is spread over 160 buildings occupying  of floor space.

Budget 
The university's overall budget was approximately 441.8 million euros in 2013, broken down as follows:
 Income of 222.6 million according to the annual report
 External funding amounting to 101.8 million euros
 Special funds from the State of Lower Saxony amounting to 58.3 million euros
 42.3 million euros from other income
 16.8 million euros from student contributions

Rankings

Measured by the number of top managers in the German economy, Leibniz University Hannover ranked 7th in 2019.

The Times Higher Education World University Rankings 2022 ranked Leibniz University Hannover between 401 and 500 worldwide.

University library and TIB 

The library was established on the founding of the Höhere Gewerbeschule/Polytechnische Schule in 1831. It expanded into an important collection as the institution evolved from a vocational/technical college into the full University. The removal of the books into storage during the Second World War secured valuable old stocks that became a unique national collection of scientific and technical literature in postwar Germany. This was the basis on which the library of the Institute of Technology was established in 1959. Today the collection forms the heart of the German National Library of Science and Technology, which is the largest institution of its kind in the world.

GISMA School of Business 
GISMA Business School in Hannover, Germany, was launched in 1999 as a joint initiative by the state of Lower Saxony and visionary private-sector enterprises. The school was closely affiliated with the Krannert School of Management at Purdue University (Indiana, USA) until 2011 when the Leibniz University Hannover briefly became its parent. In 2013 the association with Leibniz ended, and GISMA became part the for-profit education company Global University Systems.

Notable people

Faculty 

 Friedrich Bergius (1884–1949), chemist, Nobel Prize in chemistry (1931)
 Helmut Bley (born 1935), German historian, professor
 Constantin Carathéodory (1873–1950), mathematician, professor
 Horst Dreier (born 1954), lawyer
 Gerhard Ertl (born 1936), physicist and chemist, Nobel Prize in chemistry (2007)
 J. Hans D. Jensen (1907–1973), German physicist, Nobel Prize in physics (1963)
 Wilhelm Jordan, (1842–1899), professor of geodesy and practical geometry, known for the Gauss-Jordan Elimination
 Karl Karmarsch (1803–1879), engineer, educationalist
 Theodor Lessing (1872–1933), philosopher
 Herbert Lindinger (born 1933), industrial designer
 Konrad Meyer (1901–1973), SS-Oberführer and an architect of Generalplan Ost for the Germanization of Eastern Europe. Later served as a professor of agriculture and regional planning at the University of Hanover 
 Oskar Negt (born 1934), social philosopher
 Eduard Pestel (1914–1988), engineer and politician
 Ludwig Prandtl (1875–1953), physicist and engineer in fluid- and aerodynamics, professor.
 Friedrich Schwerd (1872–1953), professor for machinery and operations research, inventor of the WW I. German army Stahlhelm
 Fritz Sennheiser, (1912–2010), electronics engineer, entrepreneur: Honorary professorship.
 Klaus Töpfer (born 1938), German politician (Christian Democratic Union)

Alumni 
 Carl F. W. Borgward (1890–1963), entrepreneur, car manufacturer, engineer, non-graduate guest auditor.
 Walter Bruch (1908–1990), electronics and television engineer, honorary doctorate.
 Alfred Bucherer (1863–1927), physicist
 Wilhelm Busch (1832–1908), poet and artist
 Gustav Doetsch (1892–1977), German mathematician gained his Habilitation here
 Luise Druke (born 1948), German scholar and United Nations practitioner
 Irmgard Flügge-Lotz (1903–1974), German-American mathematician and engineer
 Henrich Focke (1890–1979), German aviation pioneer 
 Erich Gutenberg (1897–1984), German economist.
 Rento Hofstede Crull (1863–1938), electrical pioneer 
 Pascual Jordan (1902–1980), theoretical and mathematical physicist, politician (CDU)
 Wolfgang Jüttner (born 1948), German politician (SPD)
 David McAllister (born 1971), German politician (CDU)
 Christian Otto Mohr (1835–1918), civil and structural engineer
 Carl Adam Petri (1926–2010), mathematician, logician and computer scientist
 Frank Pohlmann (born 1959), American politician and businessman
 Reinhold Rudenberg (1883–1961), Head of the Department of Electrical Engineering at the Harvard Graduate School of Engineering, inventor of i.e. carrier current communications
 Maximilian Emil Hehl (1861–1916), German Architect who migrates to Brazil and project Neo-Gothic São Paulo Cathedral

Panorama

See also 
 German National Library of Science and Technology
 List of universities in Germany
 List of colleges and universities

Notes

References

External links 

 
 Leibniz Alliance Hannover (LEAH)

 
Universities and colleges in Lower Saxony
Technical universities and colleges in Germany
Educational institutions established in 1831
Buildings and structures in Hanover
1831 establishments in the Kingdom of Hanover
Tourist attractions in Hanover
1831 establishments in Germany